Le Breil may refer to:

 Le Breil-sur-Mérize, a commune in north-western France
 Lebreil, a commune in south-western France